Thomas Grevsnes Rekdal (born 16 March 2001) is a Norwegian footballer who plays as a midfielder for Odd.

Career
Before the second half of 2018–19, Rekdal signed for German fourth tier side Mainz 05 II. In 2022, he signed for Odd in the Norwegian top flight. On 6 August 2022, he debuted for Odd during a 7–0 loss to Bodø/Glimt.

Personal life
He is a son of Sindre Rekdal and nephew of Kjetil Rekdal.

References

External links
 

Living people
2001 births
Norwegian footballers
Association football midfielders
Norway youth international footballers
Eliteserien players
Norwegian First Division players
Norwegian Second Division players
Regionalliga players
Fredrikstad FK players
1. FSV Mainz 05 II players
VfB Stuttgart II players
Odds BK players
Norwegian expatriate footballers
Norwegian expatriate sportspeople in Germany 
Expatriate footballers in Germany